Sport Bissau e Benfica, commonly known as Benfica de Bissau, is a football club from Bissau, Guinea-Bissau, that plays in the Campeonato Nacional da Guiné-Bissau, the top flight of Bissau-Guinean football.

Benfica Bissau is considered to the top clubs of Guinea-Bissau alongside Sporting Bissau.

History
The club was founded on 27 May 1944 as the 29th affiliated club of Portuguese club S.L. Benfica.

In its early years, the team was the dominant in the colonial competition.  One of its first prominent players of the club was the Cape Verdean Alberto Monteiro, better known as Fialho who later moved to Portugal and played for Portuguese clubs such as S.L. Benfica and Lusitano de Évora.

After independence, the club was one of the first to win a national championship title, in 1982, they won five championship titles, in 1990, they won three more straight titles totaling eight, 20 years later they won another one, they won their tenth in 2015ref></ref> and is the recent championship winner in 2017. Also at cup competitions, they won their first cup title in 1980, their second was in 1989, their third was in 1992, 16 years later, they won their fourth one and won three straight in 2010. More recently, the club won the 2015 cup, with a 5–1 victory against Lagartos de Bambadinca.

At the continentals, Benfica played after winning their championship title in 1978, they played only in a single round, from the First round up to 1983 and the Preliminaries from 1990. They did not appear at the 1989 edition and recently the 2016 CAF Champions League. At the continental cup competition, they did not play in 1981, they played in 1990 after winning a cup title, they played in the CAF Confederation Cup in 2007, qualified as runner-up, in 2009 and 2010 as cup winner, They missed the 2011 CAF Confederation Cup due to mainly financial concerns. They recently played at the 2018 CAF Champions League after being national First Division champions.

As of 2010, in both continental championship and cup competitions, they never won a match. In a home match at the 1986 Winners' Cup with Starlight of Banjul, Gambia, they made a goal draw.

Logo
Being a Benfica affiliate, the logo owes no relation to the Benfica logo, Benfica Bissau once used the earlier logo.  Its logo has an orange shield with the blue seal encircled with the full name of the club and the word futebol (football/soccer) on the right, inside is another shield colored in blue with a crown on top and the two Bs in the middle-bottom.

Honours
Campeonato Nacional da Guiné-Bissau: 12
 1977, 1978, 1980, 1981, 1982, 1988, 1989, 1990, 2010, 2015, 2017, 2018

Taça Nacional da Guiné Bissau: 7
 1980, 1989, 1992, 2008, 2009, 2010, 2015

Performance in CAF competitions

1 Benfica Bissau withdrew

Statistics
Best position: First round (continental)
Best position at a cup competition: Preliminary Round (continental)

Players

Current squad (2015)

Staff

President: Sérgio Marques
Fiscal Council President: Roberto Marcelino da Silva
General Assembly President: Mirandolino Có
Head coach: Romão dos Santos
Assistant coach: Bentem Culubali
Physical Coach: Luís Mango
Technical Secretary: Braima Turé

References

External links

Bissau